Muanza is one of two towns of this name in Mozambique. It is the headquarters of Muanza District. It is served by the Mozambique Railway's Central line.

See also 

 Railway stations in Mozambique

References 

Populated places in Sofala Province